Robyn Michelle Mylett (born January 4, 1989) is a Canadian actress. She is best known for her role as Katy on the comedy series Letterkenny (2016–present).

Early life

Mylett was raised in Ladysmith, a town on Vancouver Island in British Columbia, Canada. She has an older brother, Richard, and a cousin, Mikayla Mary.

Career
Mylett's first job out of high school was as a cheerleader for the BC Lions of the Canadian Football League. 

Her first professional acting job was in the 2013 film Antisocial. She subsequently appeared in the films The Drownsman and She Stoops to Conquer, as well as supporting roles in the television series Ascension, The Strain, and Lost Girl. Later roles are: in the television series Four in the Morning, Bad Blood, and the films Kiss and Cry, The Curse of Buckout Road, El Camino Christmas, and as Elle in Was I Really Kidnapped.

Mylett's most prominent role is as Katy, a leading character on the television series Letterkenny . For her work on it, she was nominated for a Canadian Screen Award for Best Actress in a Comedy Series at the 8th Canadian Screen Awards in 2020.

Mylett has also starred in The Complex, a video game in full-motion video, by Wales Interactive.

Personal life
Mylett resides in Canada. She has been romantically connected to Jesse Antler.

References

External links

1989 births
Living people
Actresses from British Columbia
Canadian film actresses
Canadian television actresses
People from Ladysmith, British Columbia
21st-century Canadian actresses